The Society of Quality Assurance (SQA) is a 501(c)(6) professional association founded in 1984 that works to organize and promote quality assurance in Good Laboratory Practices regulated non-clinical laboratory environments. As of 2001, it had over 1200 members in 16 countries.

History 
SQA was established in 1984 as a grassroots gathering of Quality Assurance Professionals interested in implementing the Good Laboratory Practices (GLP). As the Society grew, membership interest expanded to include both EPA and FDA GLPs, Good Clinical Practices (GCP), Good Manufacturing Practices (GMP).

Today SQA membership includes over 2,000 professionals working in contract research organizations, academia, industry and consultancies. Membership also includes students who are interested in a career in life or environmental sciences. Members focus on quality issues in both regulated and non-regulated research and manufacturing to support research and manufacturing quality, integrity and continual improvement.

Quality Assurance Professionals 
The Society of Quality Assurance (SQA) is a professional membership society dedicated to promoting and advancing the principles and knowledge of quality assurance essential to human, animal and environmental health.

SQA Specialty Sections and Committees 
Members participate in specialty sections to address topics of interest. Specialty sections provide a forum to:
 Encourage interaction between professionals in the industry;
 Provide members with updates on proposed and/or new regulations, emerging issues and regulatory trends; 
 Develop informative training and educational opportunities on special topics; 
 Provide an opportunity for members to foster liaisons and interactions with professionals, professional organizations and regulatory agencies with related interests to maximize information exchange.
SQA Committees are a combination of volunteer, appointed and elected positions and serve to further the society's mission.

Mentoring Program 
A professional mentoring program supports individuals who wish to develop in their current or move into another area.

Registered Quality Assurance Professional (RQAP) 
SQA offers the professional credential Registered Quality Assurance Professional (RQAP). SQA offers a professional registration system for individuals practicing quality assurance in GCP and GLP environments. Registration requires both job experience in Quality Assurance and demonstrated knowledge. Exams are offered several times a year, both nationally and internationally.

SQA Publications
SQA publishes a newsletter, Quality Matters, and technical articles throughout the year.

SQA Learning Foundation 
In 2014, SQA created a subsidiary Learning Foundation to create education offerings in support of furthering the education and careers of quality assurance professionals. SQA Headquarters is in Charlottesville, VA.

References

International professional associations
501(c)(6) nonprofit organizations